Kevin Stöger (born 27 August 1993) is an Austrian professional footballer who plays as a midfielder for Bundesliga club VfL Bochum. He is the younger brother of fellow footballer Pascal Stöger.

Club career
Stöger was born in Steyr, Austria.

On 22 January 2011, Kevin Stöger had his debut for VfB Stuttgart II in the 3. Liga against FC Carl Zeiss Jena.

For the 2012–13 season he was promoted to the first team of VfB Stuttgart. Stöger made his debut for VfB Stuttgart on 31 October 2012 during the second round of the 2012–13 DFB-Pokal in a 3–0 home victory against FC St. Pauli.

In July 2013 Stöger was loaned out to 1. FC Kaiserslautern until June 2015.

He moved to SC Paderborn 07 on 26 August 2015.

He moved to newly promoted Fortuna Düsseldorf on 28 May 2018. He was given the number 22.

On 7 October 2020, Stöger signed for Mainz 05 on a free transfer, on a two-year deal.

On 10 June 2022, Stöger signed for Bochum on  a free transfer, on a two-year deal.

International career
At the age of 17 years Stöger was called up into the Austrian squad for the 2011 FIFA U-20 World Cup.

Career statistics

References

External links
 

1993 births
Living people
People from Steyr
Footballers from Upper Austria
Association football midfielders
Austrian footballers
Austria youth international footballers
Austria under-21 international footballers
Austrian expatriate footballers
VfB Stuttgart II players
VfB Stuttgart players
1. FC Kaiserslautern players
1. FC Kaiserslautern II players
SC Paderborn 07 players
VfL Bochum players
Fortuna Düsseldorf players
1. FSV Mainz 05 players
Bundesliga players
2. Bundesliga players
3. Liga players
Regionalliga players
Expatriate footballers in Germany
Austrian expatriate sportspeople in Germany